Isaac Haig Mitchell (26 June 1867 – 15 March 1952) was a Scottish trade unionist.

Born in Roxburghshire, Mitchell remained in school as a pupil-teacher after his classmates left to start work.  He later completed an apprenticeship in engineering and moved to Newcastle upon Tyne to find work.  There, he joined the Amalgamated Society of Engineers (ASE), and was immediately elected as its delegate to Newcastle Trades Council.  Through this, he worked with John Burns in supporting a railway strike.

In about 1892, Michell moved to New York City, where he found work as a millwright.  He joined the Socialist Labor Party of America, and also the Theosophical Society.  He moved back to Galashiels in Scotland in 1894, where he founded a branch of the Independent Labour Party, then moved on to Glasgow, where he was the ASE's delegate to the Trades Union Congress.  He was elected to the Parliamentary Committee of the TUC in 1898, and in 1899 became the first general secretary of the General Federation of Trade Unions (GFTU).

In contrast to other leading figures in the GFTU, Mitchell focused on conciliation and attracting new member unions to affiliate.  The Joint Board of the TUC, GFTU and Labour Representation Committee (LRC) was formed in 1905, and Mitchell became its joint secretary.

Mitchell was also politically active.  In 1904, he was elected as a Progressive Party alderman on London County Council, and he stood unsuccessfully for the LRC in Darlington at the 1906 general election, although he was only narrowly defeated.

In 1907, Mitchell accepted an offer to work as an adviser to the Board of Trade, resigning all his trade union and political offices.  He became known as "Haig Mitchell", and also drew a distinction with his past by growing a beard.  He remained with the Board and its successor, the Ministry of Labour until his retirement in 1932, by which time he was the Chief Conciliator.  He was notably supportive of increases in the salaries of trade union leaders, and led initial investigations into the Clyde Workers' Committee, informing David Lloyd George that the Socialist Labour Party was centrally involved.

References

1867 births
1952 deaths
Civil servants in the Board of Trade
Labour Party (UK) parliamentary candidates
General Secretaries of the General Federation of Trade Unions (UK)
Members of London County Council
Members of the Parliamentary Committee of the Trades Union Congress
Members of the Socialist Labor Party of America
People from the Scottish Borders
Progressive Party (London) politicians
Scottish Theosophists
Scottish trade unionists